Klaas Jan Pen (2 October 1874 – 21 April 1932) was a Dutch sports shooter. He competed in the shooting at the 1920 Summer Olympics, but the exact event is unknown.

References

External links
 

1874 births
1932 deaths
Dutch male sport shooters
Olympic shooters of the Netherlands
People from Steenwijkerland
Shooters at the 1920 Summer Olympics
Sportspeople from Overijssel